Hwang Jae-Hun  (born 10 March 1986) is a South Korean footballer who plays as a central defender for Busan IPark in the K League Classic.

Club career

Hwang was one of the Pohang Steelers draft picks for the 2009 K-League season.  Hwang only appeared once for the Steelers during 2009 and 2010, this being a league match against FC Seoul on 27 March 2010.

Hwang moved to Daejeon Citizen for the 2011 season and made a number of appearances for his new club, despite conceding an own goal in only his second game for the club.  Hwang recompensed for his error in the following match, scoring his first professional goal in a 2 - 0 win over Gyeongnam FC.  Despite being one of the first choice defenders for Daejeon, Hwang transferred during the summer to Busan I'Park.

Club career statistics

References

External links 

1986 births
Living people
Association football defenders
South Korean footballers
Pohang Steelers players
Daejeon Hana Citizen FC players
Busan IPark players
K League 1 players